Schloss Nörvenich is a schloss in Nörvenich near Cologne, Germany.

History
The schloss was established in around 1400 by Wilhelm von Vlatten and was remodeled on numerous occasions over the centuries.

In the 15th century, the property fell through marriage to Konrad Scheiffart von Merode-Bornheim. Wilhelm Scheiffart von Merode and his wife Agnes von Bylandt enlarged the house in the middle of the 16th century to the West Wing. At the end of the 16th century, the castle fell through marriage to Baron Johann Otto von Gymnich, whose family remained in possession of it until the 19th century. It then passed to Count Wolff-Metternich von Gymnich, and became known for a period as Schloss Gymnich.

Just before the Second World War, the schloss was taken over by non-aristocratic owners, and since that time it has repeatedly changed hands. The sculptor Rückriem lived and worked here from 1963 to 1971, and several Can albums were recorded here in the late 1960s and early 1970s including Soundtracks and Tago Mago; the band moved out of the castle in late 1971. The building now houses the Museum of European Art.

This earlier structure is believed to have been demolished down to the foundation in 1400 to enable the construction of a new, larger building.

Architecture
The current two-storey mansion dates to the 18th century, and stands on a high basement. It has a heavy tiled hipped roof and dormers and Gothic brickwork. Around 1950, the greater part of the roof collapsed, and the building underwent extensive restoration. A number of rooms feature richly designed stucco ceilings in the Regency style, with allegorical figures and the arms of the former aristocratic owners commonplace.

References

Literature 

 K.H. Oleszowsky: „Burgen und Schlösser der ehemaligen preußischen Rheinprovinz“ (Alexander Duncker) damals und heute, (2012/13) 
Stefania Ney: "Lebendige Heimat" Museumsführer für den Kreis Düren; 2013 Edition winterwork. 
 Henk Verbeek: „Land an der Rur", Baudenkmäler und europäische Geschichte entlang des Flusses Rur in Belgien, Deutschland und den Niederlanden; 2014 Edition „Kunststrom Rur“ Gemeinde Allendale, NL.

Castles in North Rhine-Westphalia
Buildings and structures in Düren (district)